Luigi Loir (22 December 1845 – 9 February 1916) was a French painter, illustrator and lithographer.

Biography 
Luigi Loir was born in Goritz, Austria. He was the son of Tancrède Loir François and Thérèse Leban, his wife, respectively valet and housekeeper of the French royal family in exile in Austria. Installed in the duchy of Parma in 1847, Luigi Loir studied at the school of Fine Arts of Parma in 1853. His first known painting is Paysage à Villiers-sur Seine (1865), painted two years after his return to Paris. He was primarily a landscape painter. He also became known for his ceiling paintings and worked with Jean Pastelot (1820–1870).

He realized some drawings for the biscuits brand LU and participated in the battles of Le Bourget during the Franco-Prussian War.

Loir was made a chevalier of the Légion d'honneur in 1898. He died in Paris in 1916.

Illustrated books 
 Jules Verne, Voyages extraordinaires, 1882.

Salons 
 1865: Paysages de Parme; Vue de Rome; Vue de Dieppe (gouaches).
 1879: médaille de troisième classe.
 Salon des artistes français:
 1886: médaille de seconde classe;
 1889: médaille d'or.

Works in public collections 

  
England
 London, Connaught Brown:  Quai Bourbon, s.d.
France
 Bar-le-Duc, Musée Barrois: Avant l'embarquement, effet crépusculaire, 1893.
 Bordeaux, Musée des Beaux-Arts.
 Marseille, Musée des Civilisations de l'Europe et de la Méditerranée: Félicia Mallet in L'Enfant prodigue, chromolithography.
 Paris: 
 Hôtel de ville de Paris:
 Les Préparatifs de la fête foraine, salle d'honneur du conseil municipal;
 La Rue de la Pitié vue du Val de Grâce, salon des sciences.
 Musée Carnavalet: Porte Maillot, effet de neige, la nuit, oil on canvas.
 Musée d'Orsay.
 Petit Palais: Le Marché à la ferraille.
 Rouen, Musée des Beaux-Arts.
 Czech Republic
 Prague, National Gallery: Le Métropolitain, 1899.

Canada

 Montreal Museum of Fine Art: Le Point-du-jour, Auteuil, 1883

Gallery

References

Bibliographie 
 Noë Willer, Luigi Loir, 1845-1916: peintre de la Belle Époque à la publicité: catalogue raisonné, vol. I, édition Noë Willer, 2004, 221 p.

External links 

 Luigi Loir on Artcyclopedia.
 Notice biographique on Rehs Galleries.
 Luigi Loir on Galerie Ary Jan.

 	

1845 births
1916 deaths
19th-century French painters
20th-century French painters
20th-century French male artists
French landscape painters
French marine artists
19th-century French engravers
20th-century French engravers
19th-century French lithographers
20th-century French lithographers
19th-century French illustrators
20th-century French illustrators
Chevaliers of the Légion d'honneur
19th-century French male artists